Poland competed at the 1976 Winter Paralympics in Örnsköldsvik, Sweden.

Alpine skiing

Cross‑country skiing

See also 
 Poland at the Paralympics
 Poland at the 1976 Winter Olympics

References 

1976
1976 in Polish sport
Nations at the 1976 Winter Paralympics